Fabio Felline (born 29 March 1990) is an Italian professional road bicycle racer, who currently rides for UCI WorldTeam .

Career
Felline was born in Turin. He was the youngest competitor in that year's Tour. In 2012, Felline won a semi-classic in Italy, the Giro dell'Appennino. He got the best of the sprint of a group of 20 riders who survived several climbs disseminated on the parcours.

At the end of March 2015, Felline won his first race with his new team, a short individual time trial at the Critérium International. In April, he won the second stage of the Tour of the Basque Country in a mass sprint ahead of Michael Matthews after a hilly day.

Major results

2007
 6th Overall Giro della Lunigiana
2008
 3rd Time trial, National Junior Road Championships
 7th Road race, UCI Juniors World Championships
2009
 5th Giro del Belvedere
 5th Giro del Medio Brenta
 6th Trofeo Gianfranco Bianchin
 7th Trofeo Banca Popolare di Vicenza
2010
 1st  Overall Circuit de Lorraine
1st  Points classification
1st  Young rider classification
1st Stages 2 & 3
 5th Classica Sarda
 10th E3 Prijs Vlaanderen
2011
 1st Stage 2a Brixia Tour
 6th Vuelta a La Rioja
 7th Memorial Marco Pantani
 9th Gran Premio Nobili Rubinetterie
2012
 1st Giro dell'Appennino
 1st Memorial Marco Pantani
 2nd Gran Premio Bruno Beghelli
 4th Gran Premio Industria e Commercio di Prato
 9th Gran Premio di Lugano
2013
 1st Stage 1a Settimana Internazionale di Coppi e Bartali
 1st Stage 2 Tour of Slovenia
 6th Gran Premio Nobili Rubinetterie
 6th Circuito de Getxo
 7th Memorial Marco Pantani
2014
 6th Gran Premio Città di Camaiore
 6th Gran Premio Nobili Rubinetterie
 10th Overall Circuit de la Sarthe
2015
 1st Grand Prix de Fourmies
 1st Stage 2 Tour of the Basque Country
 2nd La Drôme Classic
 3rd Overall Critérium International
1st  Points classification
1st Stage 2 (ITT)
 3rd Classic Sud-Ardèche
 4th Vuelta a Murcia
 5th Overall Eneco Tour
 5th Tre Valli Varesine
 5th Trofeo Laigueglia
 7th Classica Corsica
 7th Brabantse Pijl
 8th Strade Bianche
2016
 1st  Points classification Vuelta a España
 2nd Overall Tour de Pologne
 4th Trofeo Laigueglia
2017
 1st Trofeo Laigueglia
 2nd Time trial, National Road Championships
 4th Overall Tour de Romandie
1st Prologue
 4th Omloop Het Nieuwsblad
2018
 3rd Time trial, National Road Championships
 5th Overall Presidential Tour of Turkey
2019
 9th Overall Étoile de Bessèges
2020
 1st Memorial Marco Pantani
2021
 9th Overall Okolo Slovenska

Grand Tour general classification results timeline

References

External links

Fabio Felline's profile on Cycling Base 

Italian male cyclists
1990 births
Living people
Cyclists from Turin